The  is the racing car Speed Racer (Go Mifune in the Japanese version) drives in the anime series of the same name (known as "Mach Go! Go! Go!" in Japan). The car was designed, built, and created by "Pops Racer" (Daisuke Mifune), Speed Racer's father. It features a set of special devices which Speed Racer uses throughout the series. In the original 1967 series, the Mach Five is a white racing car with an "M" written on its hood (which does not stand for "Mach 5", but instead stands for "Mifune", both Go's last name, and the name of his father's motor company). In the 1993 American remake, the design was completely changed.

Its name probably derives from the fact that speeds above Mach 5 are known as hypersonic. However, the Mach Five cannot reach Mach speeds. The name is also a pun in two languages: the word for "five" in Japanese is "go". However, the "go" used for the car's name is a suffix attached to the names of ships, etc. Thus, the car is known in the Japanese version as simply the "Mach".

The car is designed to compete in a type of open-rules Formula Libre, where cars are usually built with the maximum power and minimum of weight.

Special features
The car has seven mechanisms triggered by buttons labeled from A to G on the steering wheel hub. Their functions (and names, taken from the Japanese production) are:

 Button A, : Releases four jacks to boost the car up so that it can be repaired. Although designed for this function, the auto jacks are more often used to jump the car short distances, as a wedge to keep the car from toppling over a waterfall, or as an alternative braking system. The spring-like sound the jacks make is distinctive to the show.
 Button B, : Sprouts special grip tires for traction over any kind of terrain (firm, icy, or unsteady ground; ocean floor; vertical mountainsides). At the same time, 5,000 horsepower (3,700 kW) is distributed evenly to all four wheels (1,250 hp/932.13 kW).
 Button C, : Powerful rotary saws protrude from the front of the Mach Five to remove obstacles in its way such as trees. Mostly used for racing in forest areas (especially when Speed gets forced off the road).
 Button D, : Releases a powerful deflector which seals the cockpit in a bullet-proof and crash-proof, and either an air-tight or water-tight chamber depending on the environment around the car. Inside it, the car driver is completely invulnerable.
 Button E, : The control for special illumination which can be traversed singly or in tandem, which enables the driver to see much farther and more clearly than with ordinary headlights. When used with the “night shades” attached to Speed's helmet, his vision is enhanced with infrared light. Button E was later modified to activate mini-wings (Pops got the idea from the Car Acrobatic Team) that would slide out from under the car to assist Speed in long jumps.
 Button F, : Used when the Mach Five is under water. First, the cockpit is supplied with oxygen. Then, a periscope is raised to scan the surface of the water. Everything that is seen is relayed down to the driver's seat by television. The 100-pound (45 kg) auxiliary supply of oxygen is enough to last for thirty minutes.
 Button G, : Releases a homing robot bird from the front of the car. The homing robot bird can fly and can carry pictures or tape recorded messages, handwritten messages, X-ray film, rope, and small Egyptian statues, and it has been used as a last resort as a makeshift weapon for means of defense. The bird-like device is operated by a built-in remote control within the cockpit.
 Button H, : This button is, unlike the other buttons, not located on the steering wheel; instead is located on a console between the seats. Button H is part of the Go Homing Robot's controls, and it simply sends the robot "home” to a pre-programmed location, usually Speed's house.

The Mach Five also has a small trunk, which is unusual in a race car but was featured in many episodes, often as a hiding place for main characters Spritle (Kurio Mifune) and Chim-Chim (Senpei).

While the original manga features many of the above functions seen in the anime, and while there are buttons on the steering wheel, it does not "codify" the functions in any way, making the letter designations exclusive to the anime.

Speed Racer X
In Speed Racer X (not to be confused with the 1993 Fred Wolf remake), the buttons had name changes, and sometimes function changes:

Button A, : Similar to the Auto-Jacks, but uses compressed air and rocket thrusters to propel the car into the air, rather than actual metal jacks (making "Aero Jack" a bit of a misnomer). Unlike the original series, this can only be used to make the car jump. This function actually appears in the original manga replacing the original Auto Jacks.
Button B, : Inflates the tires like balloons, giving them better traction (similar to monster truck tires), as well as allowing the Mach 5 to float on water.
Button C, : Instead of saws, this button activates laser "blades" to cut through obstacles.
Button D, : Closes the cockpit in a bulletproof protective dome, like the original series.
Button E, : Completely different from the original series, this shoots out a rope and grappling hook to snag objects, either to keep the Mach 5 from falling into dangerous situations, or to hoist itself out of them.
Button F, : Functionally identical to Frogger Mode, but causes a M.A.S.K.-like physical transformation in the car, the wheels folding in and maneuverability fins sprouting.
Button G, : Again, identical to the Gizmo Rocket, but with a new name.

The New Adventures of Speed Racer
The steering wheel of the Mach Five in this series had eight unmarked rectangular buttons, arranged in two columns of four on either side of the steering wheel's center. The car appeared to have the same functions as the Mach Five in the original series, but the buttons Speed pressed to activate them seemed more or less random, with the same button activating different abilities (or different buttons activating the same ability) in different episodes.

The "real" Mach Five
In 2000, a prototype Mach Five with actual cutting blades was produced as a concept car. 100 production models were planned to be made in 2002 as a street legal vehicle. Built on a 2001 Chevrolet Corvette Chassis, the body was to be extensively modified to look like the Mach Five. It was to have 345 horsepower, and cost between $75,000 and $125,000 each.

The Petersen Automotive Museum in Los Angeles, California has a mid-engine prototype of the Mach Five in its collection.

Portrayal in film

The Mach Five appears in the live-action film adaptation Speed Racer, directed by the Wachowski siblings, produced by Joel Silver, and released by Warner Bros. Pictures. The Mach Five is an actual vehicle and used in the major race of the film. Instead of being driven on pavement, it was hung from a crane and had its effects computer-generated.

Along with the Mach Five, the movie features the "Mach 4" and the "Mach 6", two different single-seater cars created specifically for stunt races. The designs of the Mach 4 and Mach 6 are vaguely reminiscent of the Mach Five's (as in the original American comics), although the only functions the Mach 6 features are the jump jacks, which are standard equipment in race cars in the movie. Little about the Mach 4 is known, as it appears only briefly in the film and is portrayed as a red-colored companion to the 6.

The film portrays the Mach Five as initially a street legal family vehicle, allowing for it to feature a rear compartment that Spritle and Chim-Chim later use to stow away in the vehicle. The Mach Five is later modified with gadgets and becomes Speed's alternate car for off-track races such as the Casa Cristo 5000, as well as everyday driving like a normal car. The Mach Five originally belonged to Speed's older brother Racer X.  Rex, who relinquished ownership of it to Speed before he left the Racer home. Speed's main car for races on the WRL track (Thunderhead, etc.) is the Mach 6. The Mach 6 was destroyed in a fixed race, but was later rebuilt for the film's final race.

The steering wheel hub is still present on this version of the Mach Five. Although most of the original functions of the car are still intact, some are activated by different buttons. The underwater functions are abandoned completely and replaced with new functions exclusive to racing combat. Instead of being built with these features from the beginning, the special functions were added to the Mach Five in order to enter it in the Casa Cristo 5000. The features that are still kept in this incarnation are:

Auto Jacks
Grip Tires (Not as belt tires but as crampon tire spikes.)
Deflector
Rotary Saws
Homing Robot

The functions abandoned in this version of the Mach Five are:
Frogger Mode
Evening Eye

The functions on this Mach Five are:
(*)New functions are represented with Bold Italics.

Control A = Jump Jacks (Originally called the Auto Jacks)

When pressed, the car releases and immediately retracts long automated car jacks that make the car jump over any hazardous obstacle. The car no longer releases these jacks to boost it for any repairs and adjustments. It is considered a standard racing gadget in the film. The jacks can be activated in pairs to perform various kinds of flips, and at specific intensities to control jump height.

Control B = Bullet-proof polymer deflector (D in the original, B activated the Grip Tires in the original)
When pressed, the car sprouts a bullet- and impact-proof shield that encloses the cockpit.

Control C = Tire Shields (C activated the rotary saws in the original, replaced Frogger Mode)

When pressed, the car sprouts shields from its tires to prevent tire damage from secret weapons of other racing competitors. Speed can control the motion of the shields by remote control inside the cockpit.

Control D = Hexodyne emergency spare tires (D activated the Deflector shield in the original, replaces Evening eye)

If a tire does get heavily damaged, this button causes it to regenerate. This function applies to any of the Mach 5's four tires.

Control E = Zircon-tipped cutter blades (C in the original, E originally activated the special Evening Eye)

When pressed, the Mach Five releases two rotary saws from the front of the car that can cut through almost anything. The cutter blades can pivot around for more dynamic combat in racing.

Control F = Tire crampon grips (B in the original, F originally activated Frogger mode in the original)

When pressed, the Mach Five sprouts special spiked grip tires for traction over any kind of terrain (firm, icy, unsteady ground, and significant slopes).

Control G = Homing robot (As in the original)

When pressed, the Mach Five releases a remote control robot bird capable of transmitting footage back to the Mach Five from wherever it is. This function wasn't used in the film.

In the 1959 movie "On the Beach" Dr Julian Osborne (played by Fred Astaire) races in a white number 5 Ferrari while wearing a white helmet and goggles—eerily similar to Speed Racer in the Mach Five.

Speed Racer: The Next Generation

In the animated 2008 series, which takes place about 40 years after the events in the original anime, the Mach Five only has a part in the second episode. The protagonists find it in pieces in a junkyard near the school they attend, and rebuild it. The second episode features the rebuilt Mach Five designed as it appeared in the original anime, the only difference's is that it is animated in CGI like all of the cars in the show and the wheel rims are black while in the original show they were a silver white color.

Minor changes have occurred in the Mach Five in this series. Although the function for the Homing Robot is present, the overall design of the actual robot has changed. In the original anime, the robot resembles a sleek, futuristic robot dove, while in this series, the robot resembles more of a metal peacock. The Deflector was used as the roof of the Mach Five. Also revealed in this show is an ejector's seat underneath the driver's seat in case of emergencies. A parachute was made, but was forgotten to be installed at the time.

Its return is brief, as one of the antagonists destroys it successfully. However, plans for a new car are discovered and soon the protagonists build the Mach 6. The Mach 6's engine is not designed to run on gas, which is a crucial story point, even though gas is still used for it through most of the series. It has all the features of the Mach Five, but redesigned or changed in some form or another. For example, the rotary saws are kept, but they're turned into laser saws, and the blades can pivot so things that are over head can be cut. The new car features a transparent, holographic screen over the dashboard that the driver can use to interact live with his crew, and with other racers. Functions are not activated by a steering wheel hub lettered A-G, but instead, by switches mounted around the steering wheel.

The Mach 6 succeeded the Mach 5 as the main vehicle for the rest of the series. More of the original gadgets were gradually revealed (such as the sludge slick) and used in future episodes. Eventually, the Mach 5 returned as Speed Racer Sr.'s main car in the season 2 premiere.

Mach Five in popular culture
NASCAR driver Bobby LaBonte was seen driving a Mach 5 themed Dodge Avenger at Richmond International Raceway in the fall of 2008. LaBonte, who was driving Richard Petty's iconic number 43 at the time, finished 21st.
The Presidents of the United States of America released a car-themed song named "Mach 5" in 1996.
Road & Track magazine released an article about a "real" Mach 5 prototype car on 31 March 2008 (the day before April 1st), about a "genuine running model" made for the 2008 film. The article included performance data and feature descriptions for the car that was "in a league by itself".
"New Future Weapon", a 2008 song by Billy Idol, mentions the titular object is "faster than a Mach Five".
In the video game Call of Duty: Modern Warfare 2 by Infinity Ward, a title can be worn in the multiplayer part of the game which displays a car wheel along with the title "Mach 5", unlocked after shooting an entire submachine gun magazine without missing.
In the Dexter's Laboratory episode "Mock 5" which is a Speed Racer parody, Dexter, who portrays Speed, drives a car with a lot of the same characteristics called the Mach 5.
In the Futurama episode "2-D Blacktop", Sal incinerates the Mach 5 in his scrapyard as a shocked Speed watches.
In the Shadow Warrior first-person shooter video game, the main character Lo Wang plays with a remote-controlled Mach-5 toy car to get a key. When playing, Lo Wang sings the Speed Racer theme.
In the online typing game, Nitro Type, it is available as an achievement car for completing 30,000 races and is renamed the "Wach 6".  It was created as a commemoration to the player CarriePirc for being the first person to reach 30,000 races on one singular account.
The Mach Five is featured in episode nine of the 2015 anime series, Yatterman Night, including its own interpretation of Chimchim named Sanpee.
In Foster's Home For Imaginary Friends, Mac fantasises about the "Mach Schnell 5," and while he does, the iconic image of Speed Racer alighting from the Mach 5 is recreated with Mac in for Speed, and the "Mach Schnell 5"—a smaller car, but, similar in appearance—stands in for the Mach 5.
The Mach Five is featured in the 2018 movie Ready Player One during a car racing scene.
A car called the "Scramjet," added in the July 2018 Grand Theft Auto Online update "After Hours", is nearly identical in shape to the Mach Five.

Real cars that resemble the Mach Five
1966 Japanese Grand Prix-winning Prince R380(1965)/Nissan R380-II(1966-68)
Le Mans-winners Ferrari 250 Testa Rossa (designed by Scaglietti around 1958 through 1961)
1969 Autobianchi A112 Runabout (designed by Marcello Gandini for Gruppo Bertone)
Aston Martin DBR1 (Le Mans winner in 1959)
Ford GT40 (which was a very popular and successful race car, mainly in Le Mans and other GT championships, in the 1960s)
Chaparral 2C
Porsche 917
 1968 Ferrari 250 P5, designed by Pininfarina
1959 Corvette Stingray Racer concept car
Chevrolet Aerovette concept car
Lamborghini Miura
Toyota 7

References

External links

 The Mach 5 on SpeedRacer.com (archived)

Fictional elements introduced in 1967
Fictional racing cars
Speed Racer
Cars designed and produced for films